The Long Beach Breakers were a minor league baseball team that played at Blair Field in Long Beach, California. They played in the independent Western Baseball League since 1978 and were not associated with any Major League Baseball team.

The Breakers were founded in 2001 and owned by Jerry Schoenfeld a California Businessman, The Breakers won a league championship in their 2001 inaugural season. They played for two seasons and were coached by Dodger Catcher Steve Yeager. The talented staff of coaches consisted of (Bench and Hitting Coach) Joe Magno former associate scout for the Cincinnati Reds and college baseball coach along with (pitching coaches) John Curtis California Angels and George Throop Kansas City Royals.  The team's success was unprecedented as a new franchise and had talented player like Matt Luke, Marc Gutfeld, Doug Grabek and pitcher Ritchie Linares helping the team to the title. Unfortunately the team was forced to fold along with the league after the 2002 season. The team was replaced in 2005 by the Golden Baseball League's Long Beach Armada.

Notable alumni
Steve Yeager, Manager - Former player for the Los Angeles Dodgers
John Curtis, First Base Coach - Former Boston Red Sox Pitcher

External links
Baseball reference

Breakers
Western Baseball League teams
Breakers
Defunct baseball teams in California
Defunct independent baseball league teams
Baseball teams established in 2001
Baseball teams disestablished in 2003
2001 establishments in California
2003 disestablishments in California